Josip 'Jozo' Gašpar (born 15 March 1973 in Sinj) is a Croatian retired footballer.

Club career
During his club career he played for hometown side Junak as well as for Dinamo Zagreb, Osijek and Marsonia. As a 16-year-old boy he was noticed by Dinamo's talent hunters and brought to Zagreb for a small amount of money.

International career
He made his debut for Croatia in an October 1992 friendly match against Mexico, coming on as a 79th-minute substitute for Dražen Biškup, and earned a total of 2 caps, scoring no goals. His second and final international was a June 1993 friendly against Ukraine.

Managerial career
He was relieved of his managerial duties at Prečko Zagreb at the beginning of April 2013 due to an incident in which he apparently stole a player's credit card and used it to buy 36 one-litre bottles of Jägermeister.

Honours

Player

Osijek
Croatian Cup: 1998–99

References

External links
 
 
 
 

1973 births
Living people
People from Sinj
Association football midfielders
Croatian footballers
Croatia international footballers
GNK Dinamo Zagreb players
NK Osijek players
NK Marsonia players
Croatian Football League players